The 1918 Oklahoma A&M Aggies football team represented Oklahoma A&M College in the 1918 college football season. This was the 18th year of football at A&M and the second under Earl A. Pritchard. The Aggies played their home games at Lewis Field in Stillwater, Oklahoma. They finished the season 4–2, 0–2 in the Southwest Conference.

Schedule

References

Oklahoma AandM
Oklahoma State Cowboys football seasons
Oklahoma AandM